Ottokar II (died 28 November 1122) was Margrave of Styria.

Biography 
He was the son of Ottokar I and grandfather of Ottokar III, from the dynasty of the Otakars. In the investiture dispute, he sided with the pope, which resulted in a battle with his brother Adalbero, who sided with the emperor, but died in 1086 or 1087.
After the Eppensteiner dynasty went extinct, Ottokar inherited their possessions in the Mur and Mürz valleys. He founded the Benedictine monastery in Garsten (Upper Austria) in 1108.

Family and children

Ottokar II was married in 1090 to Elisabeth, daughter of Leopold II of Austria and Ida of Formbach-Ratelnberg, and had three children:
Leopold the Strong.
Kunigunde (died 28 July 1161), married to Bernhard, Count of Sponheim-Marburg.
Willibirg (died 18 January 1145), married to Ekbert II, Count of Formbach-Pitten.

External links
 Ottokar II of Styria

Margraves of Styria
1122 deaths
Year of birth unknown